Phil Cook is an American guitarist, banjoist, pianist, and singer. He is a member of the freak-folk band Megafaun.  Before he became a member of Megafaun, Cook was part of DeYarmond Edison which is a band led by Bon Iver's Justin Vernon. He also plays in the band Gayngs as well as the Shouting Matches which is fronted by Vernon. Additionally he is affiliated with MC Taylor and his band Hiss Golden Messenger.

Outside of his musical career, Cook worked at the Center for Inquiry Based Learning at Duke University where he "assembled hands-on science kits for elementary schools." He draws on diverse influences including Bill Evans, Bruce Hornsby, Keith Jarrett, Jerry Douglas, Ry Cooder, Greg Leisz, John Kamman, and Bill Frisell.

His second solo album, Southland Mission, was released on September 11, 2015; it has been referred to as the greatest known example of "the John Kamman sound." Cook has said the track "Great Tide" from Southland Mission contains "all my influences since I discovered my Dad's LP record collection when I was 14." He released his first solo album, Hungry Mother Blues, in 2011. He graduated from the University of Wisconsin-Eau Claire with a degree in music in 2005.

References

Living people
Year of birth missing (living people)
Place of birth missing (living people)
American male singers
American banjoists
American folk musicians
University of Wisconsin–Eau Claire alumni
American male pianists
21st-century American pianists
21st-century American male musicians
DeYarmond Edison members